The Model A is the designation of two cars made by Ford Motor Company, one in 1903 and one beginning in 1927:
 Ford Model A (1903–1904)
 Ford Model A (1927–1931)

Model A
Rear-wheel-drive vehicles